Graft is a 1915 American film serial directed by George Lessey and Richard Stanton featuring Harry Carey. This serial is considered to be lost.

Cast

 Harry Carey as Tom Larnigan (Episodes 4-12). Carey took over lead from Hobart Henley from the fourth chapter.
 Hobart Henley as Bruce Larnigan (Episodes 1-3)
 Jane Novak as Dorothy Maxwell
 Richard Stanton as Robert Harding
 Glen White as Stanford Stone
 Nanine Wright as Mrs. Larnigan
 Mark Fenton as Roger Maxwell
 Mina Cunard as Kitty Rockford
 Jack Connolly as Ben Travers (credited as Jack F. Connolly)
 Jack Abbott as Jim Stevens (credited as Jack F. Abbott)
 Wadsworth Harris as Mark Gamble
 J. Edwin Brown (credited as Edward Brown)
 William T. Horne (credited as W.T. Horne)
 Hayward Mack
 L. M. Wells as Roger Maxwell
 Rex De Rosselli
 Fred Montague (credited as Frederick Montague)
 Andrew Arbuckle
 Hector Sarno (credited as Hector V. Sarno)
 Will E. Sheerer as Dudley Larnigan (credited as William Sheerer)
 Jack Curtis as Murphy
 Edward Clark (credited as E. Clark)
 Frank MacQuarrie
 George A. McDaniel (credited as Mr. McDaniels)

Production
In an experiment, the plot was written in a round robin by several writers for both print and film.  Each chapter was written by a different writer: Anna Katharine Green, Irvin S. Cobb, Louis Joseph Vance, Leroy Scott, Rupert Hughes, Zane Grey, James Oppenheim, C.N. Williamson, A.M. Williamson, Wallace Irwin, Reginald Wright Kaufman, James Francis Dwyer, Mrs. Wilson Woodrow, Joe Mitchell Chapple, Frederic S. Isham, George Bronson Howard, Nina Wilcox Putnam and Hugh Weir.

Chapter titles

Liquor and the Law
The Tenement House Evil
The Traction Grab
The Power of the People
Grinding Life Down
The Railroad Monopoly
America Saved from War/Busting The Steel Trust
Old King Coal
The Insurance Swindlers
The Harbor Transportation Trust
The Illegal Bucket Shops
The Milk Battle
Powder Trust and the War
The Iron Ring
The Patent Medicine Danger
The Pirates of Finance
The Queen of the Prophets
The Hidden City of Crime
The Photo Badger Game
The Final Conquest

See also
 Harry Carey filmography
 List of film serials
 List of film serials by studio

References

External links

1915 films
1915 lost films
American silent serial films
American black-and-white films
Lost American films
Films directed by George Lessey
Universal Pictures film serials
1910s American films
1910s English-language films